The First Perso-Turkic War was fought during 588–589 between the Sasanian Empire and Hephthalite principalities and its lord the Göktürks. The conflict started with the invasion of the Sasanian Empire by the Turks and ended with a decisive Sasanian victory and the reconquest of lost lands.

Background 
In 557, Khosrow I, the king (shah) of the Sasanian Empire, who had greatly increased the authority of his empire, decided to put an end to the Hephthalite Empire domination over Central Asia. He thus allied with the Göktürks in order to defeat the Hephthalites. The campaign was successful and the region north of the Oxus went to the Turks whilst the south came under Sasanian rule. An agreement was established between Khosrow I and the Turkic Khagan Istämi which set the Oxus as the frontier between the two empires. However, in 588, the Turkic Khagan Bagha Qaghan (known as Sabeh/Saba in Persian sources), together with his Hephthalite subjects, invaded the Sasanian territories south of the Oxus, where they attacked and routed the Sasanian soldiers stationed in Balkh, and then proceeded to conquer the city along with Talaqan, Badghis, and Herat.

The war 
In a council of war, Bahram was chosen to lead an army against them and was given the governorship of Khorasan. Bahram's army supposedly consisted of 12,000 hand-picked horsemen. His army ambushed a large army of Turks and Hephthalites in April 588, at the Battle of Hyrcanian Rock, and again in 589, re-conquering Balkh, where Bahram captured the Turkic treasury and the golden throne of the Khagan. He then proceeded to cross the Oxus river and won a decisive victory over the Turks, personally killing Bagha Qaghan with an arrowshot. He managed to reach as far as Baykand, near Bukhara, and also contain an attack by the son of the deceased Khagan, Birmudha, whom Bahram had captured and sent to the Sasanian capital of Ctesiphon. Birmudha was well received there, and was forty days later sent back to Bahram with the order that the Turkic prince should get sent back to Transoxiana. The Sasanians now held suzerainty over the Sogdian cities of Chach and Samarkand, where Hormizd minted coins.

Ferdowsi's Shahnameh (C.E. 1010) describes in legendary detail the dealings of Bahram Chubin and the Turkic "King Sawa" before and during the battle in which Bahram with his 12,000 men kills Sawa.

References

Sources 
 
 
 
 
 
 

 

Turkic War 1
580s conflicts
589
Military history of the Göktürks